{{Speciesbox
| status = CR
| status_system = IUCN3.1
| status_ref = 
| taxon = Bolitoglossa tzultacaj
| authority = Campbell 'et al., 2010
}}Bolitoglossa tzultacaj'' is a lungless salamander in the family Plethodontidae endemic to Guatemala.

References

tzultacaj
Endemic fauna of Guatemala
Amphibians of Guatemala
Amphibians described in 2010